The black-necklaced scimitar babbler (Erythrogenys erythrocnemis) is a species of bird in the family Timaliidae.

It is found in Taiwan. Its natural habitats are subtropical or tropical moist lowland forest and subtropical or tropical moist montane forest.

References

Collar, N. J. & Robson, C. 2007. Family Timaliidae (Babblers)  pp. 70 – 291 in; del Hoyo, J., Elliott, A. & Christie, D.A. eds. Handbook of the Birds of the World, Vol. 12. Picathartes to Tits and Chickadees. Lynx Edicions, Barcelona.

black-necklaced scimitar babbler
Endemic birds of Taiwan
black-necklaced scimitar babbler